The X-Files Collectible Card Game is an out-of-print collectible card game based on The X-Files fictional universe. The game was developed by NXT Games and published by the US Playing Card Company (USPCC) in 1996.  The game was canceled in early 1998.

Gameplay
The X-Files Collectible Card Game is played between two players using constructed decks of cards representing characters, equipment, events, and locations derived from the television show. At the onset of the game, each player selects one of the 41 possible X-File cards and places it face-down. The game's objective is to be the first player to correctly ascertain the identity of their opponent's secret X-File card. To gather clues about the facedown X-File card, players allocate a Team of Agent cards to investigate Sites. If the Team of Agents can successfully fulfill the Site investigation requirements, they may ask a characteristic question about the opponent's X-File card (ex. "Is your X-File's Affiliation Alien?" or "Is your X-File's Motive Survival?"). Players can attempt to hinder their opponent's investigation by playing Events, Bluffs, and Adversary cards from their own constructed Bureau Decks.

Card Types
The X-Files Collectible Card Game features nine distinct cards types, or suits:
 X-File: Featuring a case entity from The X-Files television series that symbolizes the dark forces underpinning the cases investigated by Mulder and Scully, each of these cards has four identifying characteristics (Affiliation, Motive, Method, and Result) about which opposing players will pose questions to determine their opponent's chosen X-File card in order to win the game. Each card represents a specific episode from the television series.
 Agent: The nemesis of the above-mentioned X-File card. While X-Files attempt to maintain their secrecy, the Agents seek to identify them. Each Agent card features a list of skills (ex. Criminal Investigation, Evidence Collection, Subterfuge), a Health rating to indicate how much damage the Agent can sustain before being Hospitalized, and a Resource Number (RES) to indicate the number of Resource Points (RP) the Agent can contribute to the Resource during the Briefing Phase.
 Adversary: An antagonist that hinders the opposing Agents by engaging in Combat. Each Adversary card has specific Activators requirements indicating when it is permissible to play. Like the Agent cards, each Adversary has a Health rating, along with Long Range Combat and Close Range Combat skills.
 Witness: Most of these cards serve to aid the investigating Agents by modifying skill checks, though a smaller subset of Witness cards will generate Resource Points or negate certain types of Adversaries.
 Site: These cards form the basis of each player's investigations and feature a Prerequisite (ex. Alien Investigation 4+) that must be satisfied by the investigating Team of Agents. The second notable component of each Site cards is a listed Question Type that may be asked of the opposing player's chosen X-File card, provided the investigating Team successfully meets the Prerequisite.
 Event: Some Event cards will hinder the Truth-seeking Agents whiles other Event cards may be used to aid the Agent complete their investigations.
 Bluff: These cards are used to deter the opposing Agents from successfully investigating Sites, typically by subtracting from the Team's skill checks or forcing the opposing player to discard valuable cards from his/her hand. In the Advanced gameplay, face-down Bluffs may be attached to a Site during the Case Assignment Phase to give the opponent pause to consider the risks of sending vulnerable Agents to the Site.
 Equipment: Attached to Agents during the Requisition Phase, Equipment cards are distinct from most Witness cards because the former can permanently modify a skill for as long as the Agent is in possession of the Equipment.
Combat: Used only in Advanced gamplay, these cards modify the results of Combat during the Combat Subroutine portion of the Investigation Phase. Some Combat cards will aid the investigating Agents while others will benefit certain Adversaries.

History
The Premiere Edition of The X-Files CCG was released in 1996 and debuted at Gen Con. 80 million cards were initially shipped on November 1st, 1996. The game was developed by NXT Games and slated to be published by Donruss. With the sale of Donruss to Pinnacle Entertainment, the licensing rights were transferred to the United States Playing Card Company (USPCC). Over the next year, USPCC would create the first expansion, codenamed 101361 (after Fox Mulder's fictional birthday), a 2nd edition set known as The Truth Is Out There, and a number of promotional cards. A second expansion, codenamed 22364 (after Dana Scully's fictional birthday) and comprising roughly 138 cards, was in development when the game was terminated in early 1998. Three collector sets were also cancelled.

NXT Games had planned an expansion set based on the impending film The X-Files.

Sets

Official sets
The following full sets were created and released by USPCC:
Premiere (November 1996) – This was the first set for the X-Files CCG, with a print run of about 80 million cards. The set contained 354 distinct cards. Card images and concepts were taken from the first two seasons of the X-Files.
The starter decks came with both Basic and Advanced rule booklets, with some cards being marked with a green "X" in the upper left corner indicating they were intended for Advanced games only. Each 60-card starter deck came with one of five 20-card banded packs "keyed to one character", plus 40 random common, uncommon and rare cards.  Only the basic agents could be found in the starter decks.
Booster packs contained 15 random cards. Ultra-rare cards could be found only in booster packs, randomly replacing one of the rares in the pack.  Ultra-rare cards included photo variants of Agents Fox Mulder, Dana Scully, Alex Krycek and Assistant Director Walter Skinner, as well as cards for Deep Throat, X, the Lone Gunmen, and pivotal events in the first two seasons.

101361 (1997) – This 125-card set, named after Fox Mulder's birthday, contained images and concepts from the third season of the X-Files. The set included five ultra-rare cards, and was notable for including no Combat or X-File cards. The 125-card set was sold in 12-card booster packs.
The Truth Is Out There (1997) – This 354-card set, named after the tagline from the show, is the second edition of the core set.  Thirty cards were removed from the Premiere list, including all ultra-rare cards and some problematic rare cards, and replaced with a new set of rare and ultra-rare cards.
 The release of The Truth Is Out There Edition served to address collation problems and general complaints regarding the Premiere Edition.  Firstly, the 41 X-File cards were only made available in the starter decks, which alleviated the problem of users acquiring an inordinate amount of these non-playable care from booster packs.  Secondly, the 50-card banded packs were better organized, and the backside of each TTIOT starter deck box featured a hole that revealed a number between 1 and 6, to better inform the buyer of which distinct cards were found within.
 In order to make collecting more attractive and to make certain scarce cards more readily available, the rarity of many cards (most notably the Sites) was changed from rare to uncommon, or vice versa.

Unreleased Cards & Prototypes

Gen Con Demonstration Deck (1996)
A couple hundred copies of this 60-card demonstration deck were used at Gen Con '96 to attract potential players.  These demo decks were intended to be returned following the demonstration and subsequently destroyed, however some were not returned and have occasionally surfaced for sale on eBay and within Facebook groups dedicated to the game. There are two versions of the Gen Con demonstration deck, one that was banded together, and the other contained in a white box labelled "Top Secret/Classified".  These cards possess number of unique features that make both versions of these rare decks highly sought after by fans and collectors, such as the following:
 Preliminary layout designs, and rough-looking Conspiracy and Resource Point graphics.
 The backside of these Gen Con cards reads, "For Demonstration Purposes Only".
 Two of these demo cards, "Alien Technology" and "Fighter Interceptor", were later released as promotional cards.
 Alternate images on many of the cards, most notably "Dana Scully", "The Cigarette Smoking Man", "Abduction", "Poltergeist Attack", and "High Resolution Camera".
 Alternate titles, such as "Paper Shackles" and "Frozen Submarine, Alaska".
 The most notable of these 60 cards (and most sought after) is "Scully's Dream, Georgetown, MD" (which was later revised to "Northeast Georgetown Medical Center, Washington, DC").
 Each card is individually numbered, in the format "XF96-00XX GCon".

Prototype items
Cards and items that were designed, but never saw official release, are discussed below:
Pewter Agent Fox Mulder and Agent Dana Scully (ca. 1997)  – Little information is known about these cards.  According to one source, these cards were intended to be sold as a special promotion or collector set, and orders were already being taken, when the game was canceled. A prototype card apparently appeared on eBay somewhere between December 2004 and January 2005, and one viewer mentioned "the asking price had too many zeros". A total of 5 pewter cards were created. 3 for Fox Mulder and 2 for Dana Scully (also referred to as the medusa due to unflattering look of Gillian Andersons character). The whereabouts of 4 of these pewters is currently known with the 5th being, "somewhere in Europe" as indicated by David May, one of the game's alpha playtesters.
 Donruss Prototype Cards – These extremely rare prototypes, developed by Donruss in 1996, featured early iterations of the cards as full bleed (or borderless) printings. The backside of these prototypes indicates the game was originally titled "The X-Files Interactive Card Game."

Legacy & Influence
Following the game's cancellation in 1998, many of the game's mechanics were adopted to form the short-lived Scooby-Doo Expandable Card Game, developed by Brian Woodward and Todd Breitenstein at Journeyman Press and distributed by the United States Playing Card Company in 2000.

Since 2020, renewed interest in The X-Files CCG has been sparked by several dedicated Youtube channels, most notably MMXFILESCCG and Alien Investigations, and a dedicated Facebook community group dubbed The X-Files Collectible Card Game.
MMXFILESCCG – Premiering in December 2020 and hosted by Michael Perrine and Matthew Caluori, this Youtube channel features numerous interviews with various former USPCC personnel behind the development and marketing of the game as well as guest interview with numerous X-Files cast members, including Dean Haglund, Chris Owens (actor), Brendan Beiser, Larry Musser, and David Lewis (Canadian actor). Additionally, the channel has featured numerous artifacts of the game, including the rare pewter cards of Agent Fox Mulder and Agent Dana Scully as well as several Gen Con demonstration decks (one of which was divided up and disbursed to dozens of dedicated fans in September 2022). Most recently, the channel has revealed never-before-seen playtest cards for the 101361 Expansion (generously provided by playtester Brian Woodward), which were also disbursed to numerous fans.
Alien Investigations – Debuting in 2022 and hosted by Stephen Arvidson, this Youtube channel focuses on The X-Files CCG's gameplay and mechanics, meticulously demonstrating how the game is played in order to make it accessible to prospective players.

Reviews
Arcane #15 (January 1997)
Backstab (Issue 1 - Jan/Feb 1997)

References

External links
 The X-Files Collectible Card Game
 The X-Files CCG (Joost Berns)
 The X-Files Collectible Card Game (Simon Goodman)

Card games introduced in 1996
Card Game
Collectible card games